Eilean Dubh is an uninhabited island in Loch Broom, one of the smaller Summer Isles. It lies about two miles south of Tanera Beag and has probably not been permanently occupied. Eilean Dubh is owned by Dr Van Arman, who built a substantial wooden chalet in the north-east cove.

Footnotes

Summer Isles
Uninhabited islands of Highland (council area)